Elections to the Madhya Pradesh Legislative Assembly were held on 26 March 1952. 1,122 candidates contested for the 184 constituencies in the Assembly. There were 48 two-member constituencies and 136 single-member constituencies, for a total of 232 seats. The Indian National Congress won a majority of seats and Ravishankar Shukla became the Chief Minister.

On 1 November 1956, under States Reorganisation Act, 1956, Madhya Bharat, Vindhya Pradesh, and Bhopal state were merged into Madhya Pradesh and the Marathi-speaking districts of Nagpur Division were transferred to Bombay State. Hence the constituencies were re-organized during 1957 elections.

Results

!colspan=10|
|- style="background-color:#E9E9E9; text-align:center;"
! class="unsortable" |
! Political party !! Flag !! Seats  Contested !! Won !! % of  Seats !! Votes !! Vote %
|- style="background: #90EE90;"
| 
| style="text-align:left;" |Indian National Congress
| 
| 225 || 194 || 83.62 || 34,34,058 || 49.07
|-
| 
| style="text-align:left;" |Socialist Party
|
| 143 || 2 || 0.86 || 6,61,874 || 9.46
|-
| 
| style="text-align:left;" |Kisan Mazdoor Praja Party
|
| 71 || 8 || 3.45 || 3,65,371 || 5.22
|-
| 
| style="text-align:left;" |Akhil Bharatiya Ram Rajya Parishad
|
| 35 || 3 || 1.29 || 1,75,324 || 2.51
|-
|
| style="text-align:left;" |S. K. Paksha
|
| 19 || 2 || 0.86 || 1,01,670 || 1.45
|-
| 
|
| 469 || 23 || 9.91 || 16,01,565 || 22.89
|- class="unsortable" style="background-color:#E9E9E9"
! colspan = 3| Total seats
! 232 !! style="text-align:center;" |Voters !! 1,55,13,592 !! style="text-align:center;" |Turnout !! 69,97,588 (45.11%)
|}

State Reorganization
On 1 November 1956, under States Reorganisation Act, 1956, Madhya Bharat (except the Sunel enclave of the Mandsaur district), Vindhya Pradesh, Bhopal State and the Sironj sub-division of the Kota district of Rajasthan were merged into Madhya Pradesh while the Marathi-speaking districts of Nagpur Division, (namely Buldana, Akola , Amravati , Yeotmal, Wardha , Nagpur, Bhandara and Chanda), were transferred to Bombay State. This resulted in increase in assembly constituencies from 184 with 232 seats to 218 constituencies with 288 seats during 1957 elections.

Elected members

See also

 1951–52 elections in India
 1952 Madhya Bharat Legislative Assembly election
 1952 Bhopal Legislative Assembly election
 1952 Vindhya Pradesh Legislative Assembly election
 1957 Madhya Pradesh Legislative Assembly election

References

State Assembly elections in Madhya Pradesh
1950s in Madhya Pradesh
Madhya Pradesh
March 1952 events in Asia